Anne Setian Kiremidjian is a Professor of Civil and Environmental Engineering at Stanford University.

Biography 
Kiremidjian earned her BA in physics from Queens College, City University of New York and BS in civil engineering from Columbia University. She then earned her MS and PhD from Stanford University.  From 1987 to 2002 she served as the Co-Director and Director of the John A. Blume Earthquake Engineering Center at Stanford University. Her research has focused on earthquake hazard as well as structural risk analysis. 

In 2014, she was elected a distinguished member of the American Society of Civil Engineers.

She is the 2018 recipient of the John Fritz Medal awarded by the American Association of Engineering Societies. 

In October 2020, she was appointed as the next C.L. Peck, Class of 1906 Professor in the School of Engineering.

In 2021, she was elected to the National Academy of Engineering for research and dissemination of probabilistic seismic hazard methods and mentoring.

References

External links 
 Anne S. Kiremidjian, Stanford University
 Anne S. Kiremidjian, Google Scholar

Living people
Year of birth missing (living people)
Place of birth missing (living people)
Stanford University staff
John Fritz Medal recipients
Members of the United States National Academy of Engineering

Columbia School of Engineering and Applied Science alumni
Queens College, City University of New York alumni
Stanford University alumni